Chantal Safu (or Safou ) Lopusa is a former public official in  the Democratic Republic of the Congo.

References

Year of birth missing (living people)
Living people
Women government ministers of the Democratic Republic of the Congo
Government ministers of the Democratic Republic of the Congo
21st-century Democratic Republic of the Congo people
21st-century Democratic Republic of the Congo women politicians
21st-century Democratic Republic of the Congo politicians